Johnny Piechnik (November 10, 1951 – August 7, 2006) was a Danish handball player who competed in the 1976 Summer Olympics.

He played his club handball with HG Håndbold. In 1976 he was part of the Denmark men's national handball team which finished eighth in the Olympic tournament. He played all six matches as goalkeeper.

References

1951 births
2006 deaths
Danish male handball players
Olympic handball players of Denmark
Handball players at the 1976 Summer Olympics
Danish people of Polish descent